Gerard P. Conley Sr. (January 3, 1930 – January 4, 2018) was an American politician from Maine. Conley, a Democrat, served in the Maine House of Representatives from 1964 to 1968 and in Maine Senate from 1968 to 1984. He spent his final term in the Senate as President of the Maine Senate (1983–1984). His son, Jerry Conley, served in the House from 1986 to 1990 and Senate from 1990 to 1994.

Gerard Conley Sr. served on the Portland, Maine City Council for 9.5 years, including a term as mayor (1971–72).

Personal
Conley was born and raised in Portland, Maine. He graduated from Cheverus High School as well as Portland Junior College (now Southern Maine Community College). Conley served in the United States Army. Conley worked, as a clerk, at the Portland Terminal Company, at the Rigby Yard. He died at Mercy Hospital in Portland, Maine.

References

1930 births
2018 deaths
Presidents of the Maine Senate
Democratic Party Maine state senators
Democratic Party members of the Maine House of Representatives
Mayors of Portland, Maine
Portland, Maine City Council members
Southern Maine Community College alumni
Military personnel from Maine